Winster is a village in the South Lakeland District of Cumbria, in North West England. Historically within the county of Westmorland, it is situated less than two miles east of Windermere, England's largest natural lake. The village is within the Lake District National Park. The village has a pub, the Brown Horse Inn, an 1850s coaching inn.

Packhorse bridges

A packhorse bridge is a bridge intended to carry packhorses (horses loaded with sidebags or panniers) across a river or stream. There are two packhorse bridges near Winster.

See also

 Listed buildings in Crook, Cumbria
 Bowland Bridge
 Bowness-on-Windermere

References

External links
  Cumbria County History Trust: Windermere and Bowness

Villages in Cumbria
Windermere, Cumbria